David Brian Miller (born 8 January 1964) is an English former professional footballer who played as a defender. He played for seven different clubs in the Football League, including Wigan Athletic during Dave Whelan's takeover of the club, as well as having two spells in non-league football. He is the son of former Burnley player and manager Brian Miller, brother-in-law of teammate and club captain Derek Scott and uncle of Chris & Paul Scott who also played for Burnley

References

Dave Miller career stats at the Post-War Players Database

1964 births
Living people
Footballers from Burnley
English footballers
Association football defenders
Burnley F.C. players
Crewe Alexandra F.C. players
Tranmere Rovers F.C. players
Preston North End F.C. players
Carlisle United F.C. players
Stockport County F.C. players
Wigan Athletic F.C. players
Morecambe F.C. players
Colne Dynamoes F.C. players
English Football League players
National League (English football) players
Stalybridge Celtic F.C. managers
English football managers